; ; both singular and plural) are foreign or migrant workers, particularly those who had moved to West Germany between 1955 and 1973, seeking work as part of a formal guest worker program. As a result, guestworkers are generally considered temporary migrants because their residency in the country of immigration is not yet determined to be permanent. Other countries had similar programs: in the Netherlands and Belgium it was called the  program; in Sweden, Denmark, Norway and Finland it was called  (workforce-immigration); and in East Germany such workers were called . However, the latter term had negative connotations, and was no longer used after World War II.

The term is widely used in Russia to refer to foreign workers from post-USSR or third-world countries.

Historical background
Following World War II there were severe labour shortages in continental northern Europe, and high unemployment in southern European countries including Turkey.

West Germany 

During the 1950s and 1960s, West Germany signed bilateral recruitment agreements with a number of countries: Italy (22 November 1955), Spain (29 March 1960), Greece (30 March 1960), Turkey (30 October 1961), Morocco (21 June 1963), South Korea (16 December 1963), Portugal (17 March 1964), Tunisia (18 October 1965), and Yugoslavia (12 October 1968). These agreements allowed the recruitment of guest workers to work in the industrial sector in jobs that required few qualifications.

There were several justifications for these arrangements. Firstly, during the 1950s, Germany experienced a so-called  or "economic miracle" and needed laborers. The labour shortage was made more acute after the building of the Berlin Wall in August 1961, which drastically reduced the large-scale flow of East German workers. Secondly, West Germany justified these programs as a form of developmental aid. It was expected that guest workers would learn useful skills which could help them build their own countries after returning home.

The first guest workers were recruited from European nations. However, Turkey pressured West Germany to admit its citizens as guest workers. Theodor Blank, Secretary of State for Employment, opposed such agreements. He held the opinion that the cultural gap between Germany and Turkey would be too large and also held the opinion that Germany didn't need any more laborers because there were enough unemployed people living in the poorer regions of Germany who could fill these vacancies. The United States, however, put some political pressure on Germany, wanting to stabilize and create goodwill from a potential ally. West Germany and Turkey reached an agreement in 1961.

After 1961 Turkish citizens (largely from rural areas) soon became the largest group of guest workers in West Germany. The expectation at the time on the part of both the West German and Turkish governments was that working in Germany would be only "temporary". The migrants, men and women alike, were allowed to work in Germany for a period of one or two years before returning to their home country in order to make room for other migrants. Some migrants did return, after having built up savings for their return. The recruitment treaty was changed in 1964 so that the Turkish guest workers could stay longer.

Until 2015, Germany had not been perceived as a country of immigration by both the majority of its political leaders and the majority of its population. When the country's political leaders realized that many of the persons from certain countries living in Germany were jobless, some calculations were done and according to those calculations, paying unemployed foreigners for leaving the country was cheaper in the long run than paying unemployment benefits. A  ('law to advance the willingness to return home') was passed. A person returning home received 10,500  and an additional 1,500  for their spouse and also 1,500  for each child if they returned to their country of origin.

There were 2 coups d'état between 1960 and 1971 in Turkey and the recruitment agreement with West Germany was signed by the head of 1960 Turkish coup d'état (the first coup in Turkey) committee, Cemal Gürsel. And 6 years after the pro-military coalition governments created around Kemalist CHP were collapsed, the military intervened again with another coup in 1971. In the years that Cold War era began, along with other coup d'états around Balkans and the Middle East, these two coups and the 1980 Turkish coup d'état were sometimes referred as foreign interventions made by CIA to integrate or sway countries (like Turkey) more into NATO as part of Operation Gladio which was formed in 1956 and dissolved in 1990. While Turkey was in this process of turmoil of events and economic collapse, the agreement between West Germany and Turkey ended in 1973 but few workers returned because there were few good jobs in Turkey. Half of the Turkish guest workers returned home, others brought in their wives and family members and settled in ethnic enclaves. In 1981 legal restrictions on the relocation of families to West Germany came into effect.

In 2013 it was revealed that ex-chancellor Helmut Kohl had plans to halve the Turkish population of Germany in the 1980s. Several SPD politicians, such as former chancellor Helmut Schmidt and his chief of staff Hans-Jürgen Wischnewski, as well as Hesse Minister-President Holger Börner were also in favor of restricting migration of Turks.

By 2010 there were about 4 million people of Turkish descent in Germany. The generation born in Germany attended German schools, but some had a poor command of either German or Turkish, and thus had either low-skilled jobs or were unemployed. Most are Muslims and are presently reluctant to become German citizens.

Germany used the  principle in its nationality or citizenship law, which determined the right to citizenship based on a person's German ancestry, and not by place of birth. Today, children of foreigners born on German soil are granted German citizenship automatically if the parent has been in Germany for at least eight years as a legal immigrant. As a rule those children may also have the citizenship of the parents' home country. Those between 18 and 23 years of age must choose to keep either German citizenship or their ancestral citizenship. The governments of the German States have begun campaigns to persuade immigrants to acquire German citizenship.

Those who hold German citizenship have a number of advantages. For example, only those holding German citizenship may vote in certain elections. Also, some jobs may only be performed by German citizens. As a rule these are jobs which require a deep identification with the government. Only those holding German citizenship are allowed to become a schoolteacher, a police officer, or a soldier. Most jobs, however, do not require German citizenship. Those who do not hold German citizenship but instead just a "right to reside" may still receive many social benefits. They may attend schools, receive medical insurance, be paid children's benefits, receive welfare and housing assistance.

In many cases guest workers integrated neatly into German society, in particular those from other European countries with a Christian background, even if they started out poor. For example, Dietrich Tränhardt researched this topic in relation to Spanish guest workers. While many Spanish that came to Germany were illiterate peasants, their offspring were academically successful (see: Academic achievement among different groups in Germany) and do well in the job market. Spanish  were more likely to marry Germans, which could be considered an indicator of assimilation. According to a study in 2000, 81.2% of all Spanish or partly Spanish children in Germany were from a Spanish-German family.

There were some, and still are, tensions in German society, because Muslim immigrants feel they have been religiously discriminated against. For example, while the Christian churches are allowed to collect church tax in Germany, Muslim mosques are not able to do so as they are not as yet organised in a cooperative association (which is sometimes criticised as forcing Christian organisation-style on non-Christians). While German universities have educated Jewish, Catholic and Protestant clerics and religious teachers, in the past none of the German universities have offered education for Muslim teachers and clerics. However, today such university courses exist.

Muslims were often also not pleased to find the Christian cross displayed in German classrooms, something that at the time was relatively common. The fact that most schools offer Catholic and Protestant religious education and ethics but no Islamic religious education has also been criticised (especially because religious education is compulsory, replaceable by ethics). Students are allowed to wear a normal headscarf in school, however in 2010 a Muslim student sued a  headmaster, because she was not allowed to wear a hijab in school.

East Germany

After the division of Germany into East and West in 1949, East Germany faced an acute labour shortage, mainly because of East Germans fleeing into the western zones occupied by the Allies; in 1966 the GDR (German Democratic Republic) signed its first guest worker contract with Poland. In contrast to the guest workers in West Germany, the guest workers that arrived in East Germany came mainly from Communist countries allied with the Soviets and the SED used its guest worker programme to build international solidarity among fellow communist governments.

The guest workers in East Germany came mainly from the Eastern Bloc, Hungary, Poland, Algeria, Vietnam, North Korea, Angola, Mozambique, and Cuba. Residency was typically limited to only three years. In addition, contact between guest workers and East German citizens was extremely limited;  were usually restricted to their dormitory or an area of the city which Germans were not allowed to enter — furthermore sexual relations with a German led to deportation. Female  were not allowed to become pregnant during their stay. If they did, they were forced to have an abortion.

Following the fall of the Berlin Wall in November 1989 and German reunification in 1990, the population of guest workers still remaining in the former East Germany faced deportation, premature discontinuation of residence and work permits as well as open discrimination in the workplace. Of the 100,000 guest workers remaining in East Germany after reunification, about 75% left because of the rising tide of xenophobia in former East German territories. Vietnamese were not considered legal immigrants and lived in "grey area". Many started selling goods at the roadside. Ten years after the fall of the Berlin wall most Vietnamese were granted the right to reside however and many started opening little shops.

After the reunification, Germany offered the guest workers US$2,000 and a ticket home if they left. The country of Vietnam did not accept the ones back who refused to accept the money, Germany considered them "illegal immigrants" after 1994. In 1995, Germany paid $140 million to the Vietnamese government and made a contract about repatriation which stated that repatriation could be forced if necessary. By 2004, 11,000 former Vietnamese guest workers had been repatriated, 8,000 of them against their will.

The children of the Vietnamese  caused what has been called the "Vietnamese miracle". As shown by a study while in the Berlin districts of Lichtenberg and Marzahn, where those of Vietnamese descent account for only 2% of the general population, but make up 17% of the university preparatory school population of those districts.

Austria 
On 28 December 1961, under the Raab-Olah agreement, Austria began a recruitment agreement with Spain, but compared to West Germany and Switzerland, the wage level in Austria was not attractive to many potential Spanish job-seekers. However, the agreements signed with Turkey (1963) and Yugoslavia (1966) were more successful, resulting in approximately 265,000 people migrating to Austria from these two countries between 1969 and 1973, until being halted by the early 1970s economic crisis. In 1973, 78.5% of guest workers in Austria came from Yugoslavia and 11.8% from Turkey.

Currently 
Today the term  is no longer accurate, as the former guest worker communities, insofar as they have not returned to their countries of origins, have become permanent residents or citizens, and therefore are in no meaningful sense "guests". However, although many of the former "guest workers" have now become German citizens, the term  or "foreigner" is still colloquially applied to them as well as to their naturalised children and grandchildren. A new word has been used by politicians for several years:  ('people with an immigration background'). The term was thought to be politically correct because it includes both immigrants and those who, being naturalized, cannot be referred to as immigrants—who are colloquially (and not by necessity xenophobically) called "naturalized immigrants" or "immigrants with a German passport". It also applies to German-born descendants of people who immigrated after 1949. To emphasize their Germanness, they are also quite often called fellowcitizens, which may result in calling "our Turkish fellow citizens" also those who are foreigners still, or even such Turks in Turkey who never had any contact to Germany.

, as a historical term however, referring to the guest worker programme and situation of the 1960s, is neutral and remains the most correct designation.  In literary theory, some German migrant writers (e.g. Rafik Schami) use the terminology of "guest" and "host" provocatively.

The term  lives on in Serbo-Croatian (Serbian, Bosnian, Croatian and Montenegrin), Bulgarian, Macedonian, and Slovene languages, generally meaning 'expatriate' (mostly referring to a second generation from the former Yugoslavia or Bulgaria born or living abroad). In Belgrade's jargon, it is commonly shortened to  derived by the Serbian immigrant YouTube star nicknamed . This is often equated to the English term "rich kid/spoiled brat" due to the unprecedented wealth that these former Yugoslavian gastarbeiters accumulate compared to their relatives that still live in the countries of former Yugoslavia, in which most of whom often struggle to financially stay afloat due to low employment rates across that region.

In modern Russia, the transliterated term  is used to denote workers from former Soviet republics coming to Russia (mainly Moscow and Saint Petersburg) in search of work. These workers come primarily from Ukraine, Moldova, Armenia, and Tajikistan; also for a guest worker from outside Europe, from China, Afghanistan, Vietnam, Angola, Mozambique, and Ethiopia.

In current day, guestworker programs extend beyond Europe as well, with state-run migrant-worker programs established in over fifty countries worldwide.

Notable descendants of Gastarbeiter

 Uğur Şahin
 Fatih Akin
 Elyas M'Barek
 El Hedi ben Salem
 Özlem Türeci
 Akif Pirinçci
 Tarkan
 Oz
 Shindy
 Jaysus
 Nasser El Sonbaty
 Bruno Labbadia
 Robert Prosinečki
 Robert and Niko Kovač
 Kristijan Golubović
 Fredi Bobic
 Maurizio Gaudino
 Cédric Soares
 Mustafa Doğan
 Mehmet Scholl
 İlkay Gündoğan
 Mesut Özil
 Kostas Mitroglou
 Mehmet Scholl
 Teoman
 Gonzalo Castro
 Mario Gómez
 Gabi Delgado-López
 Nino de Angelo
 Lou Bega
 Pietro Lombardi
 Sarah Lombardi
 Giovanni Zarrella
 Lars Castellucci
 Fabio De Masi
 Graciano Rocchigiani
 Franco Foda
 Nico Schulz
 Domenico Tedesco
 Cem Özdemir

See also 
 Buffer theory

References

Other sources

Behrends, Jan C., Thomas Lindenberger and Patrice Poutrus, eds. Fremd und Fremd-Sein in der DDR: Zu historischen Ursachen der Fremdfeindlichkeit in Ostdeutschland. Berlin: Metropole Verlag, 2003.
 Chin, Rita, The Guest Worker Question in Postwar Germany (Cambridge: Cambridge University Press, 2007).
Chin, Rita, Heide Fehrenbach, Geoff Eley and Atina Grossmann. After the Nazi Racial State: Difference and Democracy in Germany and Europe. Ann Arbor: University of Michigan Press, 2009.
Göktürk, Deniz, David Gramling and Anton Kaes. Germany in Transit: Nation and Migration 1955-2005. Berkeley: University of California Press, 2007.
 Horrocks, David, and  Eva Kolinsky, eds. Turkish Culture in German Society Today (Berghahn Books, 1996) online
 Koop, Brett. German Multiculturalism: Immigrant Integration and the Transformation of Citizenship Book (Praeger, 2002) online
Kurthen, Hermann, Werner Bergmann and Rainer Erb, eds. Antisemitism and Xenophobia in Germany after Unification. New York: Oxford University Press, 1997.
 O'Brien, Peter. "Continuity and Change in Germany's Treatment of Non-Germans," International Migration Review Vol. 22, No. 3 (Autumn, 1988), pp. 109–134 in JSTOR
Yurdakul Gökce. From Guest Workers into Muslims: The Transformation of Turkish Immigrant Organisations in Germany (Cambridge Scholars Press; 2009)

External links 

 German Embassy: Reform of Germany's citizenship and nationality law 

German words and phrases
Foreign workers
Economy of West Germany
Immigration to Germany

Portuguese expatriates in Germany
Yugoslav expatriates in Germany
Serbian expatriates in Germany
Kosovan expatriates in Germany
Romanian expatriates in Germany
Romanian expatriates in Austria
Greek expatriates in Germany
Greek expatriates in Austria
Turkish expatriates in Germany
Turkish expatriates in Austria
Tunisian expatriates in Germany
Moroccan expatriates in Germany
Ethnic groups in Germany